Season 6 of Fast N' Loud saw a surge in its cable television ratings along its key demographics.

Episodes

References 

2014 American television seasons